The following is a comprehensive discography of The Doobie Brothers, an American rock band.

Albums

Studio albums

Live albums

Compilation albums

Unauthorized releases
There have been several unauthorized collections taken from the same set of 13 early demos, including On Our Way Up.

Singles

Other appearances

References

External links

Discography
Rock music group discographies